Joan Richards MBE, was the Youth Business Advisor, Business Connect Neath Port Talbot, Wales. In 2007, she was awarded the Queen's Award for Enterprise Promotion - the  only lifetime achievement awardee that year. Richards retired in 2008.

References

Queen's Award for Enterprise Promotion (2007)
British businesspeople
Living people
Queen's Award for Enterprise Promotion (lifetime achievement)
Year of birth missing (living people)